IMRF may refer to:

 Illinois Municipal Retirement Fund
 International Maritime Rescue Federation